Sweet and sour is a type food or sauce widely used in far eastern various cuisines.

Sweet and Sour or Sweet & Sour may also refer to:

Film and TV
Sweet and Sour (1963 film), a 1963 French-Italian comedy film
Sweet and Sour (1984 TV series), a 1984 Australian TV series about a fictional music group, The Takeaways, that aired on ABC
Sweet and Sour (2000 talk show), an Australian community television talk show that debuted in 2000
"Sweet and Sour", a 1991 episode of the PBS show Shining Time Station
Sweet & Sour (film), a 2021 South Korean film

Music
Sweet & Sour (EP), an EP by Sistar 	
"Sweet 'n' Sour", a song by the Jon Spencer Blues Explosion
"Sweet and Sour", a song by Jolin Tsai from the 2005 album J-Game
"Sweet & Sour", a song by Jawsh 685

See also
Sour mix, a mixer used in many cocktails
Sweet Sour, a 2012 album by Band of Skulls
"Sweet Sour" (song), the title track from the album
Sour Sweet, a 1982 novel by Timothy Mo
Soursweet, a 1988 British film directed by Mike Newell